Akshay Sethi (born 2 October 1980) is an Indian model and  television actor. He is well known for playing the double role in Sasural Genda Phool on Star Plus.

Early life
Akshay Sethi was born on 2 October 1980 in Maharashtra, India.

Career
Akshay did many commercials like Herohonda, Rin, Limca, Rediff, Hutch, Tvsapache, Bigbazaar etc. before television. He made his television debut with Saat Phere: Saloni Ka Safar as Yug on Zee TV. Akshay also played the role of Raunak, in Grihasti on Star Plus. After that he did Waaris on Zee TV & Rahe Tera Aashirwaad on Colors TV. He also did episodic roles in Adaalat, C.I.D., Hum Ne Li Hai- Shapath, Crime Patrol, Savdhaan India. He was last seen in Sasural Genda Phool as Deepak on Star Plus.

Television

References

External links

 

Living people
Indian male television actors
1980 births
Place of birth missing (living people)